U-59 may refer to one of the following German submarines:

 , a Type U 57 submarine launched in 1916 and that served in the First World War until sunk on 14 May 1917
 During the First World War, Germany also had these submarines with similar names:
 , a Type UB III submarine launched in 1917 and scuttled on 5 October 1918
 , a Type UC II submarine launched in 1916 and surrendered on 21 November 1918; broken up at Bo'ness in 1920–21
 , a Type IIC submarine that served in the Second World War until stricken in April 1945; scuttled at Kiel

Submarines of Germany